Ivar Medaas (April 9, 1938 – January 7, 2005) was a Norwegian folksinger and fiddle player.

References

1938 births
2005 deaths
Norwegian violinists
Male violinists
Norwegian folk musicians
20th-century violinists
20th-century Norwegian male musicians